The 2013 Women's European Individual Closed Championships is the women's edition of the 2013 European Squash Individual Championships, which serves as the individual European championship for squash players. The event took place in Herentals in Belgium from 4 to 7 September 2013. Camille Serme won her second European Individual Championships title, defeating Natalie Grinham in the final.

Seeds

Draw and results

Finals

See also
2013 Men's European Individual Closed Championships
European Squash Individual Championships

References

External links
European Squash Championships 2013 official website

2013 in squash
Squash in Europe
Squash tournaments in Belgium
2013 in women's squash
International sports competitions hosted by Belgium